James Dalton (died 1601) was an English politician.

He was a Member (MP) of the Parliament of England for Saltash in 1563, 1571 and 1572, Lostwithiel in 1584 and 1586, and for Preston in 1593. He married Mary Rolle, a daughter of George Rolle (d. 1553), MP, of Stevenstone in Devon.

References

16th-century births
1601 deaths
Members of the Parliament of England for Saltash
English MPs 1563–1567
English MPs 1571
English MPs 1572–1583
English MPs 1584–1585
English MPs 1586–1587
English MPs 1593
Members of the Parliament of England for Lostwithiel
Members of the Parliament of England (pre-1707) for constituencies in Lancashire